The 1945 Toronto Argonauts season was the 56th season for the team since the franchise's inception in 1873 and the first since World War II. The team finished in second place in the Interprovincial Rugby Football Union with a 5–1 record and qualified for the playoffs for the seventh consecutive season. The Argonauts defeated the Ottawa Rough Riders in a two-game total-points IRFU Final series before winning the Eastern Final over the Toronto Balmy Beach Beachers. The Argonauts defeated the Winnipeg Blue Bombers in the 33rd Grey Cup game by a score of 35–0, winning the franchise's sixth Grey Cup championship.

Regular season

Standings

Schedule

Postseason

Grey Cup

December 1 @ Varsity Stadium (Attendance: 18,660)

References

Toronto Argonauts seasons
Grey Cup championship seasons
1945 Canadian football season by team